The 1958 1000 km Buenos Aires took place on 26 January, on the Autódromo Municipal-Avenida Paz, (Buenos Aires, Argentina).  It was the fifth running of the race, and once again, it was opening round of the F.I.A. World Sports Car Championship. For this event, it returned to the Autódromo, after having a one-off race at the Circuito de la Costanera Norte, however its layout was not generally well received.

The sport’s governing body, F.I.A. and its Commission Sportive Internationale (CSI) dictated several technical changes to the 1958 Sports Car rule book, under teams completing now see their cars’ engines limited to three litres.

Report

Entry

A grand total of 30 racing cars were registered for this event, of which all 30 arrived for practice and 26 for qualifying for the race. Although this was the first major sports car race of the year to be run since CSI’s rule changes, but as in previous years, the race was poorly supported by the works teams. Only Ferrari sent works cars from Europe. They had entered three of the stunning Ferrari 250 TRs for Peter Collins/Phil Hill, Wolfgang von Trips/Mike Hawthorn and Luigi Musso/Olivier Gendebien.

As for the other works teams from 1957, Aston Martin opted not to do the long trek to South America, while the Jaguar D-Types were no longer eligible to under these new rules, due to their 5-litre engines. As for Maserati, it was announced that due to financial difficulties, they would not continue to operate as a works team.

Qualifying

After a three-hour qualifying session held on the days prior to the race, it was Collins who took pole position for Scuderia Ferrari in their 250 TR.

However, Stirling Moss and Jean Behra were originally entered to share a Maserati 300S, but when this car broke its crankshaft during a practice session, they were offered a Porsche 550 RS.

Race

The race was held over 106 laps of the 5.888 mile, Autódromo Municipal-Avenida Paz, giving a distance of 624.162 miles (1,004.49 km). Due to the lack of opposition, it was left to Ferrari to battle amongst themselves. However, the last minute change of mount for Moss and Behra would bring some excitement to the race, added in part by what was literal invasion of Lepidopterous on race day. Butterflies tended to cover up the cars’water radiators, a problem which air-cooled cars like the Porsche did not have…  

In the race, the Scuderia Ferrari of Collins and Hill, won ahead of their teammates von Trips/Gendebien/Musso. Car number 2, took an impressive victory, winning in a time of 6hrs 19:55.4 mins, averaging a speed of 98.572 mph. Second place went to the second Ferrari, albeit 3:14.4 mins. adrift. The podium was complete by the winner of the 1957 Swedish Grand Prix, Moss and Behra who despite their small engine, were just 9.8 seconds behind.  

The race was marred by the death of a driver named Jorge Magnasco, following an accident on lap seven, when the driver overturned his Maserati 300S.

Official Classification

Class Winners are in Bold text.

 Fastest Lap: Stirling Moss, 3:47.6secs (105.830 mph)

Class Winners

Standings after the race

Note: Only the top five positions are included in this set of standings.Championship points were awarded for the first six places in each race in the order of 8-6-4-3-2-1, excepting the RAC Tourist Trophy, for which points were awarded on a 4-3-2-1 for the first four places. Manufacturers were only awarded points for their highest finishing car with no points awarded for positions filled by additional cars. Only the best 4 results out of the 6 races could be retained by each manufacturer. Points earned but not counted towards the championship totals are listed within brackets in the above table.

References

1000 km Buenos Aires
1000 km Buenos Aires
Buenos Aires